This is a list of bus types used by London bus operators and tour operators in London throughout the 20th and 21st centuries, with their year of first introduction. Bus types written in bold are currently in use.

LGOC buses
 X-type (1909)
 B-type (1910)

AEC buses

 K-type (1919)
 S-type (1920)
 T-type (1920)
 NS-type (1922)
 Regal (1929)
 Regent (1929)
 LT-type (1929)
 ST-type (1929)
 Q-type (1932)
 Regent III RT (1939)
 Regent II (1945)
 Regal III (1947)
 Regent III (1947)
 Regal IV (1949)
 AEC Routemaster (1954)
 Merlin/Swift (1964)

Alexander Dennis Buses

 Alexander Dennis Enviro200 Dart/Enviro200H  (2006)
 Alexander Dennis Enviro400/Enviro400H (2006)
 Dennis Dart (Plaxton Pointer/Carlyle Works body) (1989)
 Dennis Dart SLF (Plaxton Pointer/Alexander ALX200/Caetano Nimbus/MCV Evolution/East Lancs Myllennium body) (1995)
 Dennis Lance/Lance SLF (1991/1993)
 Dennis Trident 2 (Alexander ALX400/East Lancs Lolyne/Plaxton President body) (1999)
 Alexander Dennis Enviro400MMC
 Alexander Dennis Enviro200 MMCLeyland Buses

 Leyland Atlantean (1965)
 Leyland National (1972)
 Leyland Olympian (1984)
 Leyland Tiger (1927)
 Leyland Titan (1927)
 Leyland Titan (B15) (1978)

MCV Buses
MCV EvoSeti (on Volvo B5LH)MAN 12.240 (MCV Evolution/East Lancs Esteem body) (2007)
 MAN 14.240 (MCV Evolution/Alexander Dennis Enviro200 body) (2006)

MCW Buses
 MCW Metrobus (1978)
 MCW Metrorider (1987)

Optare Buses
 Optare Excel (1996)
 Optare MetroCity (2014)
 Optare MetroRider (1989)
 Optare Solo (1998)
 Optare Solo SR (2012) 
 Optare Tempo (both diesel and hybrid-electric) (2009)
 Optare Versa (both diesel and hybrid-electric) (2010)
 Optare MetroDecker (electric) (2019)

Scania Buses
 Scania Metropolitan (1976)
 Scania N113CRL (Wright Pathfinder body) (1992)
 Scania N113DRB (1993)
 Scania N94UD (East Lancs OmniDekka/OmniCity body) (2003)
 Scania N230UD (East Lancs OmniDekka/East Lancs Olympus/OmniCity body) (2007)
 Scania OmniTown (OmniTown/East Lancs Myllennium/East Lancs Esteem) (2003)

VDL Buses
 VDL DB250 (Alexander ALX400/Optare Spectra/Plaxton President/Wright Pulsar Gemini body) VDL DB300 (Wright Gemini 2/Wright Gemini 2 HEV body) DAF/VDL SB120 (Wright Cadet/Merit/Electrocity/Wright Pulsar Hydrogen powered body)Volvo Buses
 Volvo Ailsa B55 (1983)
 Volvo B6 (1992)
 Volvo B5L (Wright Eclipse Gemini/Wright Eclipse Gemini 2 body) (2008)
 Volvo B7L/Ayats Bravo (2004)
 Volvo B7TL (Alexander ALX400/East Lancs Myllennium Vyking/Plaxton President/Wright Eclipse Gemini body) (1999)
 Volvo B9TL (Alexander Dennis Enviro400/Wright Eclipse Gemini/Wright Eclipse Gemini 2/Optare Visionaire body) (2006)
 Volvo B10B (1993)
 Volvo Citybus 
 Volvo Olympian (1993)
 Volvo MCV EvoSeti (2015)

Wright Buses

 Wright Pulsar Gemini (2003)
 Wright Pulsar Gemini HEV (2007)
 Wright StreetLite (2010)
 New Routemaster (2012)
 Wright StreetDeck (2014)
 Wright SRM (2016)
 Wright StreetAir (2017)
 Wright Eclipse Gemini (2001-2019)

Other Buses
 Bristol LH (1975)
 DAF SB220 (East Lancs Myllennium/Optare Delta body) (1989)
 Daimler Fleetline (1979)
 Mercedes-Benz Citaro''' (2002)
 Caetano e.City Gold (2020)

See also

 Buses in London
 List of bus routes in London

References
 
 
 
 

Notes

Bus transport in London
Bus